Scrat is a fictional character in the Ice Age franchise. He is a saber-toothed squirrel who is obsessed with collecting acorns, constantly putting his life in danger to obtain and defend them. Scrat's storylines are mostly independent of those of the Herd, though the two do intersect at times.

Scrat is voiced in all Ice Age feature films and short films by director Chris Wedge, only directly interacting with the story's main characters on eight occasions, mostly with Sid. In a special feature in the second film's DVD, his name has been stated to be a mix of the words "chipmunk" and "rat", his species allegedly believed to have been a common ancestor of both. In the Ice Age DVD commentary, he is referred to as "The Scrat" by directors Wedge and Carlos Saldanha.

The character served as the mascot to his co-animation studio, Blue Sky Studios, until its closure in 2021.

Concept and creation

The true origin of Scrat's design is unclear. Initially, Chris Wedge claimed that the character was created by illustrator Peter de Sève in late 1999 while crafting a clay model, and that the name emerged naturally from the hybrid of squirrel and rat. However, in 2009, screenwriter Michael J. Wilson stated a conflicting claim that his 3-year-old daughter Flora came up with the idea for Scrat, as well as the name itself. 

Furthermore, fashion designer Ivy Supersonic has claimed since 2002 that she had initially created the character, then called "Sqrat", and the idea was stolen from her by 20th Century Fox rather than pay her royalties. Internal documents showed that within Blue Sky Studios, the character's name was changed from "Sqrat" to "Scrat". She ultimately settled with Disney, which had purchased Blue Sky Studios, for the "Sqrat" trademark, but failed to stop Scrat from appearing in future Disney works despite the names being phonetically equivalent.

In Ice Age: Scrat Tales, during the interview, Michael Knapp added that as a result, they had to remodel Scrat by re-furring, re-materializing and re-rigging the character. He was portrayed by Chris Wedge.

Fictional character biography

Ice Age
In Ice Age, Scrat first attacks Sid when the latter tries to eat his acorn, successfully regaining it. He later meets Manny, Sid, and Diego with a human baby Roshan. Manny asks Scrat where the baby's family is and Scrat attempts to tell them about nearby saber-toothed tigers, but Diego kicks Scrat away before he could do so.

Ice Age: The Meltdown
In Ice Age: The Meltdown, after Scrat creates a hole in the valley and released all the melted ice, later attacks Sid for saving his life (when he had already almost died and gone to paradise and was about to get a giant acorn).

Ice Age: Dawn of the Dinosaurs
In Ice Age: Dawn of the Dinosaurs, Scrat is stepped on by Manny and falls onto Sid's head while chasing his acorn. Next, he appears when Sid's "children" are batting a ball around, the ball actually being Scrat. Also, when Scratte rips off his fur, he screams so loud the herd can hear him, causing Crash and Eddie to deem the place a "Jungle of Misery". Lastly, while Diego is sleeping, he wakes up when he gets hit with Scrat's acorn.

Ice Age: Continental Drift
In Ice Age: Continental Drift, Scrat is taken hostage by Captain Gutt and his crew at the same time as Manny, Sid and Diego, eventually escaping once the ship sinks. Sid pries open a clam, he finds Scrat inside. Granny mistakes Scrat for a rat and continuously hits him with her cane until he falls into the ocean.

Ice Age: Collision Course
In Ice Age: Collision Course, Scrat accidentally launches several deadly meteors to Earth after an attempt to bury his acorn leads to him taking control of a UFO.

Short films
Scrat is the main character in four short films. In the first, Gone Nutty, he loses his collection of acorns in a catastrophic chain of events. He jams his acorn into a hole in the middle of the collection, which shatters the pile and with it the entire continent – which begins the continental drift. In the second film, No Time for Nuts, Scrat finds a time machine left by a time-traveler and visits several historical events. He becomes trapped in a frightening future when oak trees have become extinct but somehow manages to return to the series' time period. 

A third short film, Scrat's Continental Crack-up, was released in 2010 accompanying the feature Gulliver's Travels, and later with Rio as a promotion for Ice Age: Continental Drift.

A fourth short film, Cosmic Scrat-tastrophe, was released in 2015, preceding the theatrical release of The Peanuts Movie. Another short film, Scrat: Spaced Out was released in 2016 on home media with Collision Course.

Scrat Tales
In Ice Age: Scrat Tales, it was announced when a plush for the character of Scrat's son was also unveiled via Just Play Products' website, with the second image featuring a blue tag containing the logo for Scrat Tales, although the listing was retitled under The Ice Age Adventures of Buck Wild to promote the new spin-off film. On February 22, 2022, it was announced that the Scrat Tales would release on Disney+ on April 13, 2022.

The End
On April 13, 2022—the same day that Scrat Tales was released—a 34-second long video titled "The End" was posted on YouTube by a user simply named "Finale". This short ended the infamous running gag by featuring Scrat finally achieving his dream of eating an acorn with no catches, and then scurrying off screen, presumably to find adventure elsewhere. The short was allegedly the final piece of animation made by Blue Sky Studios before their closure in 2021, made by a small team of animators to serve as "a send off on [their] own terms." The video is currently unlisted.

Relationships

Acorns
Scrat constantly hunts for his acorn either to bury it or eat it, but fate always gets in the way. He invariably ends up in humorous or painful situations: being struck by lightning, pursued by avalanches, and repeatedly knocked unconscious while fighting for his acorn, yet he never gives up. Scrat generally loses, except when he defeats a school of piranhas and beats up Sid. The consequences of his actions have set up the main plot points for most of the Ice Age films. As shown in the first film, Scrat will never get an acorn as he's seen frozen for 20.000 years until the future.

Scratte
Scratte (pronounced "Scrat-tay") is a seductive female saber-toothed flying squirrel that makes her debut in Ice Age: Dawn of the Dinosaurs. She is seen in the second trailer with Scrat battling with her for the acorn by propelling themselves down a gorge to reach the fallen acorn, and succeeding. Scratte is also seen as a love interest for Scrat. She is voiced by Karen Disher.

Scratte's personality traits have been shown to be flirtatious, feisty, and intelligent. She is equally determined in catching the acorn and uses her feminine wiles to her advantage. She doesn't, however, seem to be nearly as obsessed with acorns as her male counterpart, as she was shown trying to destroy the acorn at the end of the film out of jealousy. Scratte will often injure and manipulate Scrat in the process of retrieving it. However, her attraction to him is implied and fully emerged when he saved her from falling into lava.

In the fourth film, Scratte appeared again in a cameo role as a Siren only to then be dismissed by a disinterested Scrat. In addition, tons of her species live on Scratlantis.

Baby Scrat
Baby Scrat is a small, neckless brown squirrel that makes his debut in Ice Age: Scrat Tales. He's the illegitimate son of Scrat and Scratte. He often does some good bonding with his father, but the acorn often ruins the moment. They often go on adventures through the tundra. He is voiced by Kari Wahlgren.

Reception

Some books like The Secret Life of Movies rated Scrat as one of the most popular Ice Age characters.

Legacy 
While initially created as a fictional species for comedic purposes, in 2011 a mammal quite similar to Scrat was described. The newly described taxon, Cronopio dentiacutus was not a squirrel, and did not live in the Cenozoic; it belonged to the dryolestoids, a group of mammals thought to be closely related to therians, and it lived approximately 100 million years ago in Patagonia. 

In 2019, a Triassic Pseudotherium argentines (living 231 million years ago) was described, that caught attention for its similarity to the Scrat character. 

The precedence of the animated character to the discovery of the real animal is an example of what is known as the "Dim Effect".

Controversy 
On February 13, 2002, Ivy Supersonic filed a lawsuit against Fox, claiming that she had created the character in May 1999, after seeing a squirrel-rat hybrid in Skidmore College's Case Green, and intended it to be "the next Mickey Mouse". She called her character "Sqrat" and pitched it to numerous celebrities and studios from 1999 to 2001, although she was unwilling to accept the $50,000 deal she was offered by Urban Box Office Network for a web series, believing the character to be worth "seven figures". She passed on any subsequent potential deals to use the character, until realizing in November 2001 that Ice Age had a similar character named Scrat, and believed the studio had stolen her idea. A CNN report by Jeanne Moos of Ivy's discovery was aired in 2000, two years before Ice Age was released. Supersonic claims the studio's own documents actually identified the character in Ice Age as "Sqrat", though her creation was not saber-toothed. Internal Blue Sky Studios emails obtained by Business Insider support her claims, showing that the name "Sqrat" was "all over the computer files" for the movie until the character's name was changed partway through development, and that a technical director had argued that the name should be returned to "Sqrat".

Supersonic was offered a $300,000 settlement by Fox. She turned it down and subsequently lost in court. The case later went to appeal (Case # 04401 Court of Appeals, Second Circuit, NYC). Supersonic still had hopes of receiving damages for her claimed infringement. She did win a partial summary judgment from the Trademark Trial and Appeal Board in a reverse suit, Fox Entertainment Group, Inc. and Twentieth Century Fox Film Corporation v. Ivy Silberstein (her real name), in which Fox had tried to prevent her from registering the trademark "SQRAT". In 2022, the absence of the character from The Ice Age Adventures of Buck Wild sparked rumors that Disney had completely lost the trademark dispute, with critics unhappy about Scrat's omission from the film. This was later shown not to be the case, as Scrat Tales was released in 2022 directly featuring the character.

See also
List of Ice Age characters
Cronopio (mammal)

References

External links

Official character page (current)
Official character page (former)
Scrat at Blue Sky Studios
Ice Age: Scrat's Nutty Adventure

Animated characters in film
Film characters introduced in 2002
Animated characters introduced in 2002
Fictional squirrels
Fictional characters with immortality
20th Century Studios animated characters
Ice Age (franchise)